The episodes covering the third and fourth seasons of The Prince of Tennis anime series are directed by Takayuki Hamaااات animated by Trans Arts, and co-produced by Nihon Ad Systems, J.C.Staff, and Production I.G. The two seasons originally aired on the terrestrial Japanese network TV Tokyo from October 2002 to August 2003. The anime is an adaption of Konomi's Prince of Tennis manga series created in 2000. The series revolves around a 12-year-old tennis prodigy named Ryoma Echizen, who moves back to his native Japan in order to attend his father's alma mater, a private middle school famous for its strong tennis team.

Viz Media handled the distribution of the series in North America, where the anime debuted as streaming media on Viz's and Cartoon Network's joint online broadband service called Toonami Jetstream on July 14, 2006. It first aired on North American television as part of Toonami's Saturday programming block on December 23, 2006. In April 2021, Funimation announced they acquired the series.

Four pieces of theme music are used for the episodes in seasons three and four: two opening themes and two ending themes. The first opening theme, "Make You Free" by Kimeru and Hisoca, and the first ending theme, "White Line" by Aozu - the voice actors of Ryoma Echizen, Tezuka Kunimitsu, Shusuke Fuji, and Shuichiro Oishi - are used from episode fifty-four to seventy-five. The second opening theme, "Long Way" by Ikuo, and the second ending theme,  by Fureai (ふれあい), are used for the remaining episodes of the two seasons.

Episode list

Season 3
Kanto Tournament Saga – Part I: Hyotei Academy (Eps. 54–69)

Tezuka's Departure saga (Filler eps. 70–75)

Kanto Tournament Saga – Part II: Josei Shonan Jr. High (Semi-Filler eps. 76–78)

Season 4
Kanto Tournament Saga – Part III: Josei Shonan's 2nd Playoffs (Semi-Filler eps. 79–85)

Recreation Saga – Part I (Eps. 87–90)

Kanto Tournament Saga – Part IV: The Semifinals – Rokkaku Jr. High (Eps. 91–97)

See also
List of The Prince of Tennis episodes
Tennis no Ōjisama – Futari no Samurai

References
General

Specific

2002 Japanese television seasons
2003 Japanese television seasons
Season 3-4